Wesley Davis Shivers (born March 8, 1977) is an American professional mixed martial artist.  He was a cast member of SpikeTV's The Ultimate Fighter: Heavyweights.  Shivers also played in three National Football League games with the Atlanta Falcons in 2000.
Shivers had a small role in the movie Never Back Down 2: The Beatdown and Universal Soldier: The Reckoning as well as an appearance in the pseudo reality show The Devils Ride as Bobby Slaughter in season 3.

Football career
After he entered high school at Benton Academy, Wes decided that he wanted to devote all of his time to American football. After graduation, Shivers attended a junior college prior to attending Mississippi State University. Shivers played on the football team as an offensive tackle. He was named a Junior College All-American, as well as being on the All-Southeastern Conference team.  Shivers was drafted by the Tennessee Titans in the seventh round of the 2000 NFL Draft and played three games with Atlanta before being cut. Shivers became a police officer after retiring but retired from that to pursue MMA.

Mixed martial arts career
After picking up 4 stoppage wins in local Mississippi organizations, Shivers spent a good part of 2009 participating in the UFC's The Ultimate Fighter: Heavyweights. In his first fight, he lost a controversial majority decision to eventual semi-finalist James McSweeney.

After more than a year, Shivers returned to action, defeating Goldman Butler at Strikeforce Challengers: Wilcox vs. Ribeiro via KO.

Mixed martial arts record

|-
| Win
| align=center| 8–1
| Goldman Butler
| KO (punch)
| Strikeforce Challengers: Wilcox vs. Ribeiro
| 
| align=center| 1
| align=center| 2:15
| Jackson, Mississippi, United States
| 
|-
| Win
| align=center| 7–1
| Jerry Carol
| Submission (arm-triangle choke)
| Psychout - MMA
| 
| align=center| 1
| align=center| 1:49
| Jackson, Mississippi, United States
| 
|-
| Loss
| align=center| 6–1
| Brad Tidwell
| KO (punch)
| Fight Force International - Blood and Sand 6
| 
| align=center| 2
| align=center| 0:16
| Byram, Mississippi, United States
| 
|-
| Win
| align=center| 6–0
| Justin Thornton
| KO (punch)
| Psychout - MMA
| 
| align=center| 3
| align=center| 1:16
| Byram, Mississippi, United States
| 
|-
| Win
| align=center| 5–0
| Christopher Adams
| KO (punch)
| Fight Force International - Blood and Sand 5 
|  
| align=center| 1
| align=center| N/A
| Biloxi, Mississippi, United States
| 
|-
| Win
| align=center| 4–0
| Carlton Little
| Submission (rear-naked choke)
| KOTC: Reckless
|  
| align=center| 1
| align=center| 1:53
| Greenville, Mississippi, United States
| 
|-
| Win
| align=center| 3–0
| Greg Maher
| KO (punches)
| Fight Force International - Blood and Sand 4 
| 
| align=center| 1
| align=center| 1:42
| Biloxi, Mississippi, United States
| 
|-
| Win
| align=center| 2–0
| Bo Hooks
| TKO (punches)
| Fight Force International - Beatdown 
| 
| align=center| 1
| align=center| 0:10
| Hattiesburg, Mississippi, United States
| 
|-
| Win
| align=center| 1–0
| James Neely
| Submission (guillotine choke)
| ShoXC: Elite Challenger Series
| 
| align=center| 1
| align=center| 2:22
| Vicksburg, Mississippi, United States
| 
|}

Mixed martial arts exhibition record

|-
| Loss
| align=center| 0–1
| James McSweeney
| Decision (Majority)
| The Ultimate Fighter: Heavyweights
| 
| align=center| 2
| align=center| 5:00
| Las Vegas, Nevada
| 
|}

References

External links

1977 births
Living people
People from Brandon, Mississippi
Players of American football from Mississippi
American football offensive tackles
Mississippi State Bulldogs football players
Tennessee Titans players
American male mixed martial artists
Atlanta Falcons players